The Relief of Qasr al-Bahili was the successful relief of the Arab garrison of the small fortress of Qasr al-Bahili from the siege by the Turkic Türgesh Khaganate. Sent by the Umayyad Caliphate's governor of Khurasan, an Arab relief force under al-Musayyab ibn Bishr al-Riyahi managed to break the siege and escort the garrison to safety in Samarkand.

The siege marked the beginning of the Türgesh invasion of Transoxiana, which the Arabs had only recently subdued, and which became a battleground between the two empires for the following two decades.

Background 
The region of Transoxiana had been conquered by the Umayyad leader Qutayba ibn Muslim in the reign of al-Walid I, following the Muslim conquests of Persia and Khurasan in the mid-7th century. The loyalties of Transoxiana's native Iranian and Turkic populations and those of autonomous local rulers remained questionable, however, as demonstrated in 719, when the Transoxianian princes sent a petition to the Chinese and their Türgesh vassals for military aid against the Caliphate's governors. 

The situation was made worse by the incompetence of the Arab governor Abd al-Rahman ibn Nu'aym. His successor Sa'id, who took office in 720, was not much better: he had no experience of the province and his unwarlike nature earned him the mocking sobriquet , from the Khurasanis. Sa'id appointed the capable Shu'bah ibn Zuhayr al-Nahshali as his deputy in Samarkand, but after the locals rioted, he was dismissed and replaced by Uthman ibn Abdallah ibn Mutarrif ibn al-Shikhkhir, perhaps, as H. A. R. Gibb writes, "in a vain attempt to appease the insurgents".

Siege and relief of Qasr al-Bahili 
The weakness of the Arab administration, and the petitions of the Transoxianian princes, led the Türgesh ruler, the  Suluk, to launch an attack, which caught the Arabs entirely off guard. Under the leadership of Kursul, the Türgesh were able to surround the fortress of Qasr al-Bahili ('Fort of the Bahila'), whose garrison numbered 100 families, according to the report of al-Tabari. Fearing that reinforcements from Samarkand would not arrive in time, the garrison of Qasr al-Bahili proposed to buy peace for 40,000 silver s, as well as giving seventeen of their own men as hostages to Kursul until the tribute was paid. 

When the Arab governor of Samarkand, Uthman ibn Abdallah ibn Mutarrif ibn al-Shikhkhir, learned of the Türgesh attack, he called for volunteers from the Arab settlers of Khurasan. 4,000 men from all the Arab tribes present in Khurasan presented themselves, but according to al-Tabari, when the appointed commander, al-Musayyab ibn Bishr, warned them that they were about to enter "the arena of the Turks, the arena of the Khāqān", where they faced death and martyrdom, 1,300 left. During the march, the Arabs were met by a local ruler, the king of Qiyy, who informed them of events at Qasr al-Bahili, and added that Kursul, having learned of the Arabs' approach, had slain his hostages. The king of Qiyy also warned the Arabs that all the Iranian aristocracy (s) of the area had gone over to the Türgesh, and offered 300 of his own men to assist them.

When he was two s from the fort, al-Musayyab sent two riders, one Arab and one non-Arab, to approach the fort and scout out the situation under cover of night. Although the Türgesh had flooded the area around the castle to obstruct access, they managed to make contact with the garrison and inform them of the Arab army's approach, before returning to al-Musayyab. When his spies informed him of the situation, al-Musayyab decided to march immediately, and attack the Türgesh under cover of night. He instructed his men to muzzle their horses until the attack, and to focus on breaking the enemy resistance, rather than pursue anyone fleeing the battle. 

With the break of dawn, the Arabs, who had approached within two bowshots of the Türgesh camp, issued the cry "", and charged. The Arabs penetrated deep into the Türgesh encampment, but the latter recovered quickly and pushed the attack back. The Arabs withdrew around their commander, with many dismounting to fight; they suffered numerous casualties in the process. According to an eyewitness who was in the fortress, "when the two armies engaged in battle, we thought that the Day of Resurrection had arrived on account of what we heard, namely, the groans emitted by the soldiers, the clashing of iron, and the neighing of the horses." In the end the Arabs prevailed, although the sources cited by al-Tabari mention no details. Al-Musayyab instructed his men to move straight for the fortress and help evacuate its garrison, and "not carry off any goods, except money, and do not carry off anyone who can walk", but only the women, children, and weak of body. Together, the Arabs made for Samarkand, so that when the Türgesh returned the next day, they found nothing but the corpses of their fallen.

Aftermath
The relief of the fortress was celebrated and retold in story and song, but it also revealed the precarious situation the Muslims now faced. These events prompted the Umayyads to appoint the capable general Sa'id ibn Amr al-Harashi as governor of Khurasan. Al-Harashi quickly seized the initiative, defeated the rebels at Samarkand, and proceeded to restore Muslim rule almost to what it had been during the time of Qutayba, except for the Ferghana Valley, effective control over which was lost. Nevertheless, in 724 al-Harashi's successor Muslim ibn Sa'id al-Kilabi and his army suffered a heavy defeat (the so-called "Day of Thirst") at the hands of the Türgesh when he tried to subdue Ferghana. This defeat pushed the Arabs on the defensive, and even though no pitched battles took place, over the next few years the Arab position in Transoxiana collapsed swiftly. 

Widespread dissatisfaction with the Arab rule resulted in a general uprising of Transoxiana in 728, and, with Türgesh military aid, the Arabs were evicted from almost the entire region, even invading Khurasan itself in 737. Transoxiana thereafter remained contested, and the Arabs did not recover their previous position until the campaigns of the Umayyad governor Nasr ibn Sayyar in 739–741, who took advantage of the collapse of the Türgesh khaganate into civil wars after Suluk's murder in 738.

Reference

Sources
 
 
 
 
 

720s conflicts
720s in the Umayyad Caliphate
721
Qasr al-Bahili
Qasr
Qasr al-Bahili
Samarqand Region